Huayuankou may refer to these towns in China:

Huayuankou, Henan, in Zhengzhou, Henan
Huayuankou, Jilin, in Jingyu County, Jilin